Sheraton Hamilton, built in 1985, is a 19-storey, 299 room hotel in downtown Hamilton, Ontario, Canada. Situated on King Street West, East of Bay Street North, the hotel is part of the Lloyd D. Jackson Square complex.

The hotel has 1,200 square metres (13,000 sq. feet) of meeting space, and direct connections to FirstOntario Centre, the Hamilton Convention Centre/Ellen Fairclough Building and Lloyd D. Jackson Square.

In September 2008, the hotel underwent about $10 million in renovations, and changed ownership to local developer Darko Vranich and his Burlington-based company, Vrancor Group.

Images

See also
 Lloyd D. Jackson Square
 Hamilton Convention Centre
 List of tallest buildings in Hamilton, Ontario

References

External links
 Sheraton Hamilton website
 Hamilton Skyscraper page- diagrams

Hotel buildings completed in 1985
Buildings and structures in Hamilton, Ontario
Hotels established in 1985
Sheraton hotels
1985 establishments in Ontario